Anna Wikland is a Swedish business executive.

Early life and education 
Wikland played and coached elite-level handball for many years. She studied in the United States.

Career 
From 2006 to 2014, Wikland worked for digital marketing startup Keybroker, eventually becoming CEO. In 2014, she joined Google and in April 2016, she became Google's Country Director for Sweden.

Wikland was named one of Sweden's most powerful women in tech in 2017 by Business Insider.

References 

Living people
Google people
Swedish business executives
21st-century Swedish businesswomen
21st-century Swedish businesspeople
Year of birth missing (living people)
Place of birth missing (living people)